Scythris penicillata is a moth belonging to the family Scythrididae. The species was first described by Pierre Chrétien in 1900.

It is native to Eurasia.

References

penicillata